Euphantus (fl. c. 320 BCE) of Olynthus was a philosopher of the Megarian school as well as an historian and tragic poet. He was the disciple of Eubulides of Miletus, and the instructor of Antigonus II Gonatas king of Macedonia. He wrote many tragedies, which were well received at the games. He also wrote a very highly esteemed work, On Kingship, addressed to Antigonus, and a history of his own times. He lived to a great age.

Athenaeus refers to Euphantus relating a detail about Ptolemy III Euergetes of Egypt, who reigned much later. The discrepancy has been explained variously, by supposing the existence of an Egyptian Euphantus, or by amending "III" to "I".

Notes

References

4th-century BC Greek people
4th-century BC philosophers
4th-century BC historians
Hellenistic-era historians
Classical Greek philosophers
Philosophers of ancient Chalcidice
Ancient Greek dramatists and playwrights
Ancient Olynthians
Megarian philosophers
Tragic poets